Lillian Ross may refer to:
 Lillian Ross (politician), Canadian politician
 Lillian Ross (journalist) (1918–2017), American journalist and writer